The following are the basketball events of the year 1974 throughout the world.
Tournaments include international (FIBA), professional (club) and amateur and collegiate levels.

ABA
1974 ABA All-Star Game
1974 ABA Playoffs
1973–74 ABA season

Most Valuable Player: Julius Erving, New York Nets
Rookie of the Year: Swen Nater, San Antonio Spurs
Coach of the Year: Joe Mullaney, Utah Stars
ABA All-Star Game MVP:Artis Gilmore
ABA Finals Most Valuable Player Award:Julius Erving

NAIA
1974 NAIA Basketball Tournament

NBA
1973-74 NBA season
1974 NBA Playoffs
1974 NBA Draft
1974 NBA Finals, Celtics beat Bucks 4-3
1974 NBA All-Star Game

NBA awards
NBA Finals MVP:John Havlicek, Boston Celtics
Most Valuable Player: Kareem Abdul-Jabbar, Milwaukee Bucks
Rookie of the Year: Ernie DiGregorio, Buffalo Braves
Coach of the Year: Ray Scott, Detroit Pistons
NBA All-Star Game MVP:Bob LanierAll-NBA First Team:Walt Frazier, New York Knicks
Rick Barry, Golden State Warriors
Gail Goodrich, Los Angeles Lakers
John Havlicek, Boston Celtics
Kareem Abdul-Jabbar, Milwaukee Bucks

Note: All information on this page were obtained on the history section on NBA.com

EBAEBA Most Valuable Player: Ken Wilburn, Allentown JetsEBA Rookie of the Year: Dennis Bell, Allentown JetsEBA Coach of the Year''': Howie Landa, Allentown Jets

FIBA
1973–74 FIBA European Champions Cup
1973–74 FIBA Women's European Champions Cup

College
Men
1974 NCAA Men's Division I Basketball Tournament
1974 National Invitation Tournament
1974 NCAA Men's Division II Basketball Tournament

Women
AIAW women's basketball tournament

Women's tournaments

1973–74 FIBA Women's European Cup Winners' Cup
1974–75 Ronchetti Cup

International Competition

Basketball at the 1974 Asian Games
1974 FIBA Intercontinental Cup

Naismith Memorial Basketball Hall of Fame
Class of 1974:
Ernest Schmidt

Births
February 7 – Steve Nash, Canadian Basketball Hall of Famer
March 27 – Marcus Camby, American Basketball player
August 9 – Derek Fisher, American Basketball player
September 7 – Antonio McDyess, American Basketball player
September 10 – Ben Wallace, American Basketball player
September 17 – Rasheed Wallace, American Basketball player
October 2 – Anthony Johnson, American Basketball player
November 5 – Jerry Stackhouse, American Basketball player
November 23 – Malik Rose, American Basketball player

Deaths
March 21 – Bill Mokray, American Hall of Fame basketball historian (born 1907)
April 16 – Everett Shelton, American Hall of Fame college coach (born 1898)
September 16 – Phog Allen, American Hall of Fame college coach (born 1885)
October 15 – Maury John, American college coach (Drake, Iowa State) (born 1919)

See also

 1974 in sports

References

External links 
 Basketball-Reference.com's 1974 NBA Playoffs page
 NBA History